Hernando Guerrero, O.S.A. (1572 – July 1, 1641) was the Archbishop of the Catholic Archdiocese of Manila (1634–1641) and the Bishop of the Diocese of Nueva Segovia (1628–1634).

Biography
Hernando Guerrero was born in Alcaraz, Spain and was an ordained priest of the Order of Saint Augustine.

On December 17, 1626, Urban VIII appointed him Bishop of Nueva Segovia. He was consecrated bishop in 1628 by Pedro de Arce, Bishop of Cebu. On January 9, 1634, Urban VIII appointed him Archbishop of Manila where he served until his death on July 1, 1641. While bishop, he was the Principal Consecrator of Diego Aduarte, Bishop of Nueva Segovia (1635).

References

External links and additional sources
 (for Chronology of Bishops) 
 (for Chronology of Bishops) 

1572 births
1641 deaths
Bishops appointed by Pope Urban VIII
Roman Catholic archbishops of Manila
Augustinian bishops
17th-century Roman Catholic bishops in the Philippines
Roman Catholic bishops of Nueva Segovia

Roman Catholic Archdiocese of Manila